Metropolitan City of Reggio Calabria is an area of local government at the level of metropolitan city in the Calabria region of the Republic of Italy. It comprises the territory of the city of Reggio Calabria and 97 other municipalities (comuni) in the hinterland of the city. With more than 600,000 inhabitants, it is one of the main metropolitan areas. It replaced  the Province of Reggio Calabria in 2017.

Comprising the 'toe' of the boot-shaped Italian Peninsula, the Aspromonte massif dominates the western part of the metropolitan city's territory: with its long coastline, it is a popular tourist destination during the summer.

History
The Metropolitan City was created by the reform of local authorities (Law 142/1990), and then established by the Law 56/2014.

Government
The Metropolitan City is headed by the Metropolitan Mayor (Sindaco metropolitano) and the Metropolitan Council (Consiglio metropolitano).

List of Metropolitan Mayors of Reggio Calabria

References

External links
 Province of Reggio Calabria official website
 Città di Reggio Calabria official website
 Information on Southern Italy  Naples, Italy, Consulate General of the United States. (Includes links to relevant official websites, Italian and American, including area governments, colleges and universities, cultural, travel and tourism sites related to the region.)

Reggio Calabria